Kellogg is a city in the Silver Valley of Shoshone County, Idaho, United States, in the Idaho Panhandle region.  The city lies near the Coeur d'Alene National Forest and about 36 miles (58 km) east-southeast of Coeur d'Alene along Interstate 90.  As of the 2010 United States Census, the city had a total population of 2,120, down by a third from its population in 1980.

History

Kellogg was incorporated in 1907.  The city limits included mine property in 1955, and smelter property in 1956.  The population in 1960 was about 6000.

Kellogg is named after a prospector named Noah Kellogg. After nearly a century of bustling activity in the mines, including a history of disputes between union miners and mine owners, the Bunker Hill Mine (& smelter) closed in 1981, leaving thousands out of work and a history of lead contamination. Other mines reduced operations, as well.  Since the mines have closed, Kellogg has been moving more towards a resort town; the development of new condos, hotels, restaurants, shops, a water park, and a new golf course continues at the base of the Silver Mountain Gondola. Kellogg was featured in The New York Times travel section in 2008 as an up-and-coming resort town.

The gondola began service  in 1990.

Sunshine Mine
In May 1972, the Sunshine Mine of Kellogg was the site of one of the worst U.S. mining accidents, resulting in the deaths of 91 miners; as a result, every miner in the U.S. now carries a "self-rescuer" (a breathing apparatus made with hopcalite and much simpler than a SCBA), which gives the miner a chance to avoid death due to carbon monoxide poisoning. Eight days after the fire started, two men emerged from the mine. They were found on the 4800 ft (1463 m) level of the mine near a fresh air source. All others trapped in the mine had died.

Sunshine Mine remained open until February 16, 2001, producing 360 million troy ounces (11,000,000 kg) of silver.  Sterling Mining has plans to continue exploration and development of the mine, exercising an option the company purchased in 2003.

Geography

Climate
Kellogg has a mixture of a dry-summer continental climate and a cold mediterranean climate. The area is prone to both heat spikes and cold snaps in spite of fairly moderate averages. The coldest daily maximum recorded was  during said 1968 cold snap. Diurnal temperature variation is quite low in winter but very high in summer. As a result, warm summer nights are rare.

Demographics

2010 census
As of the census of 2010, there were 2,120 people, 903 households, and 526 families residing in the city. The racial makeup of the city was 94.0% White, 0.4% African American, 2.2% Native American, 0.3% Asian, 0.1% Pacific Islander, 1.0% from other races, and 2.0% from two or more races. Hispanic or Latino of any race were 3.2% of the population.

There were 903 households, of which 29.8% had children under the age of 18 living with them, 35.8% were married couples living together, 15.3% had a female householder with no husband present, 7.2% had a male householder with no wife present, and 41.7% were non-families. 34.4% of all households were made up of individuals, and 12.4% had someone living alone who was 65 years of age or older. The average household size was 2.29 and the average family size was 2.91.

The median age in the city was 40.4 years. 24.4% of residents were under the age of 18; 8.3% were between the ages of 18 and 24; 23.5% were from 25 to 44; 27.6% were from 45 to 64; and 16.3% were 65 years of age or older. The gender makeup of the city was 50.0% male and 50.0% female.

2000 census
As of the census of 2000, there were 2,395 people, 1,023 households, and 603 families residing in the village. The racial makeup of the city was 94.70% White, 0.13% African American, 1.59% Native American, 0.25% Asian, 0.25% Pacific Islander, 0.46% from other races, and 2.63% from two or more races. Hispanic or Latino of any race were 1.75% of the population.

There were 1,023 households, out of which 30.0% had children under the age of 18 living with them, 43.0% were married couples living together, 11.8% had a female householder with no husband present, and 41.0% were non-families. 35.3% of all households were made up of individuals, and 16.7% had someone living alone who was 65 years of age or older. The average household size was 2.27 and the average family size was 2.94.

In the city, the population was spread out, with 26.1% under the age of 18, 8.1% from 18 to 24, 26.1% from 25 to 44, 21.4% from 45 to 64, and 18.4% who were 65 years of age or older. The median age was 37 years. For every 100 females, there were 93.9 males. For every 100 females age 18 and over, there were 89.1 males.

The median income for a household in the village was $25,898, and the median income for a family was $32,260. Males had a median income of $29,214 versus $17,391 for females. The per capita income for the village was $16,274. About 17.3% of families and 21.8% of the population were below the poverty line, including 30.2% of those under age 18 and 7.3% of those age 65 or over.

References

Further reading
 Brock, James.  The Sunshine Mine Disaster.  Moscow: U of Idaho P, 1995.
 Conley, Cort.  Idaho for the Curious.  Cambridge: Backeddy, 1982, 457–487.
 Olsen, Gregg.  The Deep Dark: Disaster and Redemption in America's Richest Silver Mine.  New York: Three Rivers, 2006.
 Weston, Julie Whitesel, "The Good Times Are All Gone Now:  Life, Death and Rebirth in an Idaho Mining Town."  (University of Oklahoma Press, 2009).

External links
  - City of Kellogg
 Chamber of Commerce - Silver Valley Chamber of Commerce
 Shoshone News Press - county newspaper
University of Idaho Library - various images of early Kellogg

Cities in Idaho
Cities in Shoshone County, Idaho